is a Japanese competitor in synchronized swimming.

She won two bronze medals at the 2015 World Aquatics Championships.

References

Living people
Japanese synchronized swimmers
1993 births
World Aquatics Championships medalists in synchronised swimming
Sportspeople from Osaka
Synchronized swimmers at the 2015 World Aquatics Championships
Synchronized swimmers at the 2016 Summer Olympics
Olympic synchronized swimmers of Japan
Olympic bronze medalists for Japan
Olympic medalists in synchronized swimming
Medalists at the 2016 Summer Olympics
21st-century Japanese women